Hoenea is a genus of moth in the family Lecithoceridae. It contains the species Hoenea helenae, which is found in China.

References

Natural History Museum Lepidoptera genus database

Lecithocerinae
Monotypic moth genera